The 2014 Mississippi State Bulldogs baseball team represents the Mississippi State University in the 2014 NCAA Division I baseball season. The Bulldogs play their home games at Dudy Noble Field.

Schedule and results
Game results and box scores can be found at the reference.

SEC Tournament

Mississippi State, the 5 seed, beats 12 seed Georgia and beats 4 seed South Carolina. They then lose to 9 seed Kentucky in an upset and lose to 1 seed Florida, eliminating them immediately before the semifinal game.

NCAA tournament

Mississippi State, a regional 2 seed in the Lafayette Regional, beats regional 3 seed San Diego State and 4 seed Jackson State. Louisiana–Lafayette, having lost their first game to Jackson State, beats San Diego State and Jackson State, then beats Mississippi State twice to win the regional. Mississippi State finishes 2nd in the regional.

MLB Draft

Rankings

References 

Mississippi State Bulldogs Baseball Team, 2014
Mississippi State Bulldogs baseball seasons
Miss